Metal: Hellsinger is a rhythmic first-person shooter video game developed by Swedish developer The Outsiders for Microsoft Windows, PlayStation 5, PlayStation 4, Xbox One, and Xbox Series X/S. It is published by Funcom and was released on September 15, 2022. It was nominated for the British Academy Games Award for Audio Achievement at the 19th British Academy Games Awards.

Gameplay
The game mixes elements from both first person shooters and rhythm games, drawing particular reference from the rebooted Doom franchise. While navigating the demonic game world, players are faced by a raiment of demons and accompanied by a heavy metal score. Players deal extra damage if their attacks are synchronised to the beat of the music, with additional instruments joining the song as the combo meter increases. This meter can also be maintained by performing other actions, such as dashing and reloading, to the beat. This beat is also represented in environmental elements, such as fire animations, in what the game calls the "natural rhythm of the universe". Additional challenge levels named Torments can be beaten to unlock power-ups.

The game also draws on elements of the bullet hell genre, with large numbers of projectiles in the battlefield in some fights. Players have a high level of manoeuvrability, being able to double jump and dash forwards in mid-air as in Doom Eternal, and manoeuvring is key in those bullet hell segments. The game is divided across nine layers of hell (including the tutorial), each of which culminates in a boss fight against an aspect of the Judge, the game's antagonist.

Plot
A lost soul named simply "The Unknown" seeks to regain her stolen voice. She must break free of her prison in the hells, and fight her way to face the ruler of hell, The Red Judge. She is accompanied by Paz, a talking skull who acts as the game's narrator. Determined to prevent her own prophesised doom, the Judge sends the armies of hell to stop The Unknown. Later in the game, it is revealed that both the Red Judge and Paz are archangels that conspired to hide The Unknown in Hell as she was too dangerous, and that the Red Judge knew the hells would strip her of her memory, hiding her plans from herself. The game leaves on a cliff-hanger in the post-credits cutscene, as it's shown Paz has travelled to the mortal world and is trying to find The Unknown again, before a shadowy figure that looks similar to The Unknown enters the same building as him.

Development
Development began in the wake of the cancellation of The Outsiders' previous game, Darkborn. The team decided to use their own music, rather than existing metal, out of both budgetary restraints and the technical need to split the music into layers for the fury meter system. The game was announced in June 2020, initially billed for a 2021 launch, but was delayed to 2022 "in order to meet the high expectations for the game".

Soundtrack
All composition by Two Feathers, with each song featuring a guest vocalist.

Reception

Eurogamer was positive about the game, noting that it "feels like an outpouring of emotion, as though the game itself is also a different, more personal kind of gestalt," beyond its references to the genre. IGN'''s review was more mixed, stating that while the game was good it was very short and the bosses were repetitive, adding "Metal: Hellsinger might not be the greatest demon-slaying shoot 'em up in the world, but it's certainly a stirring tribute". PC Gamer'' had a similar assessment, adding that it while it was unlikely to impact the genre, it was "a perfectly fine game with lots of replay value, some neat ideas, a good soundtrack and a goofy story."

More than 1 million copies of the game had been sold by December 2022.

References

External links
 

2022 video games
First-person shooters
Golden Joystick Award winners
Indie video games
PlayStation 4 games
PlayStation 5 games
Rhythm games
Single-player video games
Video games developed in Sweden
Windows games
Xbox One games
Xbox Series X and Series S games